Hornera may refer to:
 Hornera (bryozoan), a genus of bryozoans in the family Horneridae
 Hornera, a genus of plants in the family Lauraceae, synonym of Neolitsea
 Hornera, a genus of plants in the family Fabaceae, synonym of Mucuna